These Four Walls is the debut studio album by Scottish indie rock band We Were Promised Jetpacks, released on 15 June 2009 in the UK, and on 7 July 2009 in the US by FatCat Records. The band recorded the album at Earth Studios in Odiham, Hampshire, England with producers Ken Thomas, Joylon Thomas, and Peter Katis. Four singles were released from the album: "Quiet Little Voices" in May 2009, "Roll Up Your Sleeves" in June 2009, and the double A-side single "It's Thunder and It's Lightning" and "Ships With Holes Will Sink" in November 2009. Following the album's release, an EP of alternate recordings and unreleased tracks entitled The Last Place You'll Look was issued in March 2010.

The album was reissued by FatCat as a double gold-coloured LP in July 2019 to mark its tenth anniversary. The expanded edition included 8 previously unreleased tracks chosen from early live performances, demos and radio sessions.

Release
On 15 June 2009, the band celebrated the album's release with an acoustic performance at Buchanan Street HMV, and performed the album in its entirety at Glasgow's King Tut's Wah Wah Hut later that evening.

Track listing

Personnel
Adam Thomson – vocals, guitar
Michael Palmer – lead guitar
Sean Smith – bass
Darren Lackie – drums
Ken Thomas – producer, recording, mixing ("A Half Built House", "Short Bursts" and "An Almighty Thud")
Joylon Thomas – producer, recording, mixing ("A Half Built House", "Short Bursts" and "An Almighty Thud")
Peter Katis – additional production, additional recording, additional instruments, mixing
Greg Giorgio – additional mixing 
Alan Douches – mastering, mixing ("A Half Built House", "Short Bursts" and "An Almighty Thud")
dlt – artwork
Sounds on "A Half Built Home" taken from The Conet Project

References

2009 debut albums
We Were Promised Jetpacks albums
FatCat Records albums